Roscoe Nance (December 8, 1948 – January 9, 2020) was an American sportswriter.

References

1948 births
2020 deaths
People from Enterprise, Alabama
Sportswriters from Alabama